In the legal theory, reception is chiefly defined as the transfer of a legal phenomenon 'of a different legal culture', other area or other period of time 'to a new legal climate'.

Voluntary reception
According to Max Rheinstein term "reception" should preferably be preserved to those situations in which legal phenomena of one legal climate are consciously and willingly adopted into another legal system.

Legal necessity reception

Where there is an apparent need for a change of legal system in one culture and another existing culture provides an opportunity to satisfy the need

Legal veneration reception

Veneration reception is one example which occurs if alien norms, institutes or a whole system is adopted for their venerated position and prestige of cultural background.

Imposed legal  reception

If a legal phenomenon is imposed upon another nation by force, this is referred to as imposed legal reception, in few instances  under certain  conditions imposed reception may transform into a voluntary process and thus become genuine reception but usually imposed legal phenomenon would not be considered genuine legal  reception.

Legal transplantation

Is a process whereby a legal phenomenon transfers to another geographic area or culture together with people. A situation where a norm of another legal culture is established in a different legal climate by enacting legislation regardless of its original implementation background may also be interpreted as a mere transplantation of a legal phenomenon. Transplantation also occurs where a legal theory is taken to another geographical area. As in the case of imposed reception or voluntary reception, an original transplantation may become true reception: of course not among the group or nation which is the carrier of transplantation but among the legal culture surrounding it in the new area. The transformation of transplantation into reception is perhaps of greater significance in the history of legal science than it is in positive law.

Methodological and systematic  reception

in which the spread of legal doctrines and theories plays an especially important role. It is quite clear that the spread of methods brings about the spread of their conceptual and systematic basis. In this regard, system not only refers to a certain classification of legal material, but an internally consistent and systematic approach to law.

'Doctrine of reception' in common law

In common law, the doctrine of reception (properly, reception of the common law of England in a colony) refers to the process in which the English law becomes applicable to a British Crown Colony, or protectorate.

In Commentaries on the Laws of England (Bk I, ch.4, pp 106–108), Sir William Blackstone described the doctrine as follows:
Plantations or colonies, in distant countries, are either such where the lands are claimed by right of occupancy only, by finding them desert and uncultivated, and peopling them from the mother-country; or where, when already cultivated, they have been either gained by conquest, or ceded to us by treaties. And both these rights are founded upon the law of nature, or at least upon that of nations. But there is a difference between these two species of colonies, with respect to the laws by which they are bound. For it hath been held, that if an uninhabited country be discovered and planted by English subjects, all the English laws then in being, which are the birthright of every subject, are immediately there in force... But in conquered or ceded countries, that have already laws of their own, the king may indeed alter and change those laws; but, till he does actually change them, the ancient laws of the country remain, unless such as are against the law of God, as in the case of an infidel country.

(Note: the 'infidel country' reference here was mainly intended to prohibit customs considered barbaric by the British, such as cannibalism, once a territory was colonized, in an age when communications between the British government and her far-flung colonies could take months on end.)

In other words, if an 'uninhabited' territory is colonised by Britain, then the English law automatically applies in this territory from the moment of colonisation; however if the colonised territory has a pre-existing legal system, the native law would apply (effectively a form of indirect rule) until formally superseded by the English law, through Royal Prerogative subjected to the Westminster Parliament.

Hong Kong
In practice, it could take years or even decades for the native law in a colony to be gradually superseded by the English law. The legal history of Hong Kong provides an illustration of this point: after the colonization by the British Empire in 1841, the Great Qing Legal Code remained in force for the local Chinese population. Until the end of the 19th century, Chinese offenders were still executed by decapitation, whereas the British would be put to death by hanging. Even deep into the 20th century and well after the fall of the Qing dynasty in China, Chinese men in Hong Kong could still practice polygamy by virtue of the Qing Code—a situation that was ended only with the passing of the Marriage Act of 1971.

See also
 Common law#Propagation...
 Reception statute in former British colonies
 Terra nullius

References

Common law
International law
Management cybernetics